In enzymology, phenylpyruvate tautomerase or Macrophage migration inhibitory factor is an enzyme that catalyzes the chemical reaction

keto-phenylpyruvate  enol-phenylpyruvate

Phenylpyruvate tautomerase has also been found to exhibit the same  keto-enol tautomerism for 4-Hydroxyphenylpyruvic acid, which is structurally similar to phenylpyruvate but contains an additional hydroxyl moiety in the para position of the aromatic ring.

This enzyme belongs to the family of isomerases, specifically those intramolecular oxidoreductases interconverting keto- and enol-groups.  The systematic name of this enzyme class is phenylpyruvate keto---enol-isomerase. This enzyme is also called phenylpyruvic keto-enol isomerase.  This enzyme participates in tyrosine metabolism and phenylalanine metabolism.

Structural studies

References

 
 
 

EC 5.3.2
Enzymes of known structure